The Allen–Cahn equation (after John W. Cahn and Sam Allen) is a reaction–diffusion equation of mathematical physics which describes the process of phase separation in multi-component alloy systems, including order-disorder transitions.

The equation describes the time evolution of a scalar-valued state variable   on a domain  during a time interval , and is given by:

It is the L2 gradient flow of the Ginzburg–Landau free energy functional. It is closely related to the Cahn–Hilliard equation.

References

Further reading 
http://www.ctcms.nist.gov/~wcraig/variational/node10.html

External links 

 Simulation by Nils Berglund of a solution of the Allen-Cahn equation 

Equations of fluid dynamics
Partial differential equations
Equations